The Grange Academy is a coeducational academy school in Runcorn, Cheshire. It is an all-through school providing primary and secondary education for pupils aged 3 to 16.

Formerly The Grange Comprehensive School, in June 2007 plans were announced for the school to close and to merge with The Heath School in 2012. However, the Education & Skills Select Committee raised objections to the proposal and it was decided that the school would join the adjacent Grange Nursery School, The Grange Infant School and The Grange Junior School to be an all-through school to be named The Grange School.  Following improved examination results in 2008, the plan to merge with The Heath School was cancelled and the school became all-through in September 2010.

Notable former pupils
Susan Nickson, television screenwriter

References

External links
The Grange Academy official website

Runcorn
Secondary schools in the Borough of Halton
Primary schools in the Borough of Halton
Academies in the Borough of Halton